Bala/Gibson Lake Water Aerodrome  is located  southwest of Bala, Ontario, Canada.

See also
List of airports in the Bala, Ontario area

References

Registered aerodromes in Ontario
Seaplane bases in Ontario
Transport in Bala, Ontario